Blood & Treasure is an American action adventure television series created by Matthew Federman and Stephen Scaia that premiered on May 21, 2019 on CBS. Federman and Scaia also serve as writers and executive producers alongside Taylor Elmore, Ben Silverman, Marc Webb, and Mark Vlasic. In June 2019, CBS renewed the series for a second season. In May 2022, it was announced that the series moved from CBS to Paramount+. The second season premiered on Paramount+ on July 17, 2022. In February 2023, the series was canceled after the second season.

Premise
Blood & Treasure centers on "a brilliant antiquities expert and a cunning art thief who team up to catch a ruthless terrorist who funds his attacks through stolen treasure. As they crisscross the globe hunting their target, they unexpectedly find themselves in the center of a 2,000-year-old battle for the cradle of civilization."

Cast and characters

Main

 Matt Barr as Danny McNamara, a former FBI agent who now works as a lawyer specializing in repatriating stolen art
 Sofia Pernas as Lexi Vaziri, a thief and con woman partnered with Danny despite their tortured past. Her mother was secretly a member of the Brotherhood of Serapis and a descendant of Cleopatra.
 James Callis as Simon Hardwick (né Karim Farouk), an international smuggler who was rescued by Danny after being kidnapped by Farouk and now seeks to uncover the secrets behind the Brotherhood. He later kills Hegazi, allegedly as revenge for the torture he suffered at his hands, but really to keep Hegazi from revealing that he wasn't really Farouk. In the season finale, it is revealed that he was the real Karim Farouk all along, as well as Reece's illegitimate son.
 Katia Winter as Gwen Karlsson (season 1), an Interpol agent assigned to the Farouk case
 Michael James Shaw as Aiden Shaw (né Dwayne Coleman), an arms dealer with ties to Farouk. He reluctantly assists Danny and Lexi at first, but eventually develops an acceptable working relationship with them.
 Oded Fehr as Karim Farouk (né Rasheed Hegazi) (season 1), an Egyptian terrorist leader who was seemingly killed in a drone attack, but somehow survived and now seeks to steal ancient artifacts so he can weaponize them. He is shot and killed by Hardwick, who is revealed to be the real Farouk.
 Alicia Coppola as Dr. Ana Castillo (season 1), Danny's mentor who is regarded as the world's foremost expert on Cleopatra. She is murdered near the end of the first season by Jay Reece after uncovering the connection between him and Karim Farouk.
 Mark Gagliardi as Father Chuck, an old friend of Danny's who works as a priest in the Vatican foreign ministry
 Michelle Lee as Violet (season 2), Lexi's former partner in crime and friend, whom she left behind after a heist gone wrong. She is eventually revealed to be the Great Khan, the leader of a shady organization looking to take over the world using an ancient artifact known as the "Spirit Banner".

Recurring

 John Larroquette as Jay Reece (season 1), a billionaire and father figure to Danny who oversees his effort to find Castillo and stop Farouk's plan. It is later revealed that, not only was he responsible for framing Danny's father for art theft, but Farouk is Reece's son, having been abandoned after Reece had a fling with a woman named Zara Farouk. He also murdered Dr. Castillo after she discovered the link between him and Farouk.
 Antonio Cupo as Captain Bruno Fabi (season 1), an officer in the Carabinieri TPC, and secretly a member of the Brotherhood of Serapis. He dies after being shot while helping Danny and Lexi.
 Tony Nash as Omar (season 1), Farouk's second-in-command until he is killed after surrendering to the police
 Ali Hassan as Taj bin Yusef (season 1), a member of Farouk's organization who takes over after he is killed
 Anna Silk as Roarke (season 1), an ex-black ops agent, secretly hired by Reece, who goes after Danny and Lexi
 Victoria Diamond as Kate Reece (season 2), Jay Reece's daughter and Danny's former fiancée
 Ron Yuan as Batu/The Great Khan (season 2), a terrorist leader searching for the spirit banner of Genghis Khan. He is later revealed to be a decoy for the real Great Khan, Violet.
 Byron Mann as Vince Tran (season 2), a Vietnamese former cop turned private investigator who frequents Shaw's bar in Hanoi

Episodes

Series overview

Season 1 (2019)

Season 2 (2022)

Production

Development
On November 30, 2017, it was announced that CBS had given a series order to Blood & Treasure, a new television series created and written by Matthew Federman and Stephen Scaia. The series order was reportedly for a first season of thirteen episodes in which Federman and Scaia will also executive produce alongside Taylor Elmore, Ben Silverman, Marc Webb, and Mark Vlasic. Webb is also set to direct the series as well. Production companies involved in the series include CBS Television Studios. On March 26, 2019, it was announced that the series is set to premiere on May 21, 2019.

On June 26, 2019, CBS renewed the series for a second season. On May 17, 2022, it was reported that the series is moving from CBS to Paramount+ and is set to premiere on July 17 with two new episodes and the rest debuting on a weekly basis. On February 17, 2023, Paramount+ opted not to return for a third season.

Casting
On March 12, 2018, it was announced that Katia Winter, Michael James Shaw, and James Callis had been cast in series regular roles. On May 18, 2018, it was reported that Sofia Pernas had joined the main cast in the lead female role. On June 15, 2018, it was announced that Matt Barr had been cast in the series' lead male role. On July 25, 2018, it was reported that Alicia Coppola had joined the main cast. On August 28, 2018, it was announced that Anna Silk had been cast in a recurring role. On January 31, 2020, Paget Brewster was cast in a recurring capacity for the second season, but she was unavailable due to the COVID-19 pandemic and replaced by Francesca Romana De Martini.

Filming
Principal photography for the first season took place in the summer of 2018 in Montreal, Canada, Rome, Turin, Venice, Italy, Gressoney Saint-Jean, Vatican City, Marrakesh, and Tangier, Morocco. Filming for the second season began in October 2019.

Reception

Critical response
On review aggregation Rotten Tomatoes, the series holds an approval rating of 54% with an average rating of 5.78/10, based on 13 reviews. The critics consensus states, "Blood & Treasure never finds the X that marks the sweet spot, but viewers who heed an undemanding call to adventure may find some charm in the series' concept." Metacritic, which uses a weighted average, assigned the series a score of 52 out of 100 based on 7 critics, indicating "mixed or average reviews".

Ratings

References

External links

 
 

2010s American drama television series
2020s American drama television series
2019 American television series debuts
2022 American television series endings
American action adventure television series
CBS original programming
English-language television shows
Paramount+ original programming
Television series by CBS Studios
Treasure hunt television series
Television shows filmed in Montreal
Television shows filmed in Italy
Television shows filmed in Vatican City
Television shows filmed in Morocco